Classic Elton John is a compilation of Elton John tracks released by PolyGram Special Markets in 1994.  It was available as a CD or cassette only from McDonald's as a promotion to raise money for the Ronald McDonald House Charities.

Track listing

References

1994 greatest hits albums
Elton John compilation albums
Charity albums